Telmatobius thompsoni is a species of frog in the family Telmatobiidae.
It is endemic to Peru.
Its natural habitats are subtropical or tropical high-altitude shrubland, rivers, swampland, freshwater marshes, and intermittent freshwater marshes.

References

thompsoni
Amphibians of the Andes
Amphibians of Peru
Endemic fauna of Peru
Taxonomy articles created by Polbot
Amphibians described in 1993